Petrovka is a rural locality (a selo) in Balyklinsky Selsoviet, Fyodorovsky District, Bashkortostan, Russia. The population was 32 as of 2010.

Geography 
It is located 12 km from Fyodorovka, 3 km from Balykly.

References 

Rural localities in Fyodorovsky District